Atkins High School located at Winston-Salem, Forsyth County, North Carolina, was dedicated on April 2, 1931, as a facility for African American students. The building, equipment and grounds were valued at that time at $400,000. This was paid primarily by the city, with a grant of $50,000 from the Rosenwald Fund.

History 
Dr. Simon Green Atkins came to Winston-Salem from Raleigh, North Carolina, where he graduated from St. Augustine Normal and Collegiate Institute (now St. Augustine's College). In 1890, he accepted the position of principal of Depot Street School in Winston-Salem. Dr. Atkins was the organizer, secretary, and agent of the board that started Slater Industrial Academy in 1892, now Winston–Salem State University. Dr. Atkins served as principal of Slater on a part-time basis for the first two years of its existence, while he continued his work as principal of Depot Street School. As Slater Industrial Academy grew, the demands upon Dr. Atkins' leadership and direction increased. In 1895, he resigned his position at Depot Street School to devote himself entirely to Slater Academy.

Julius Rosenwald was a president of Sears Roebuck who was noted for supporting black schools throughout the south. The first principal was John Carter, who had previously been a professor at Winston-Salem Teacher's College. He continued as principal until 1959. The school curriculum included both an academic track for those students intending to go on to college, and a vocational track for those intending to start work immediately. Atkins served as a high school until 1971, when it then converted into a junior high school.

It was listed on the National Register of Historic Places in 1999.

The Atkins name was transferred to the Simon G. Atkins Academic & Technology High School in September 2005, which opened at a different school building. The site of the former Atkins High School is now the Winston-Salem Preparatory Academy.

Notable alumni 

 Hubbard Alexander  college football and NFL coach
 Hannah Atkins  member of the Oklahoma House of Representatives from 1968 to 1980, and the first African-American woman elected to it
 William Bell  served as mayor of Durham, North Carolina
 Carl Eller  NFL defensive end, member of Pro Football Hall of Fame
 Herman Gilliam  NBA player
 Happy Hairston  NBA player
 Ike Hill  NFL defensive back
 Lawrence Joel  United States Army soldier and Medal of Honor recipient
 Willie Porter  professional basketball player
 Togo D. West, Jr.  American attorney and public official
 Nadine Winter  community activist and Democratic politician in Washington, D.C.
 Larry W. Womble  member of the North Carolina General Assembly

References

External links 
 Official site

African-American history in Winston-Salem, North Carolina
School buildings on the National Register of Historic Places in North Carolina
Neoclassical architecture in North Carolina
School buildings completed in 1931
High schools in Winston-Salem, North Carolina
Rosenwald schools in North Carolina
Defunct schools in North Carolina
National Register of Historic Places in Winston-Salem, North Carolina